Begoña Fernández Molinos (born 22 March 1980 in Vigo) is a former Spanish team handball player. She was member of the Spanish national team.

She played at the 2008 European Women's Handball Championship in the Republic of Macedonia, where the Spanish team defeated Germany in the semifinal, and received silver medals after losing the final. She was selected into the all-star-team and named the best pivot of the tournament.

She was part of the Spanish team that won the bronze medal at the 2012 Summer Olympics.

References

External links
 
 
 
 

1980 births
Living people
Spanish female handball players
Sportspeople from Vigo
Olympic medalists in handball
Olympic handball players of Spain
Handball players at the 2012 Summer Olympics
Olympic bronze medalists for Spain
Medalists at the 2012 Summer Olympics
Expatriate handball players
Spanish expatriate sportspeople in Serbia
Spanish expatriate sportspeople in North Macedonia
Mediterranean Games medalists in handball
Mediterranean Games gold medalists for Spain
Competitors at the 2005 Mediterranean Games
Competitors at the 2009 Mediterranean Games
21st-century Spanish women